Tarky Lombardi Jr. (born September 2, 1929) is a former New York State Senator.

He was born on September 2, 1929, in Syracuse, New York, and graduated from New York Military Academy in 1947. He later earned a degree at the College of Law at Syracuse University.

He was a Republican member of the New York State Senate from 1966 to 1992, sitting in the 176th, 177th, 178th, 179th, 180th, 181st, 182nd, 183rd, 184th, 185th, 186th, 187th, 188th and 189th New York State Legislatures. He was Chairman of the Committee on Finance from 1989 to 1992. Sen. Tarky Lombardi Jr. was known as a proponent of community services, including New York's nursing homes without walls program. His Chief of Staff was Bob Herz.

References 

1929 births
Living people
Politicians from Syracuse, New York
Republican Party New York (state) state senators
Syracuse University College of Law alumni
New York Military Academy alumni
Lawyers from Syracuse, New York